Again may refer to:

Entertainment
 Again (video game), a 2009 adventure game for the Nintendo DS
 Again!! manga
 Again!, a 2011 children's book by Emily Gravett
 Again (film), a 2015 Japanese film

Music
 Again (band), a Chinese rock band

Albums
 Again (Oliver album), 1970
 Fitzgerald and Pass... Again, 1976
 Again (Alan Stivell album), 1993
 Again (Jewelry album), 2002
 Again (Colder album), 2003
 Again (Pnau album), 2003
 Again (Retro Grave album), 2010
 Again (Ayumi Hamasaki EP), 2012
 Again (T-ara EP), 2013

Songs
 "Again" (1949 song), a popular song written by Lionel Newman and Dorcas Cochran and also recorded by many other singers
 "Again", by James Gang from Thirds, 1971
 "Again" (Shizuka Kudo song), 1987
 "Again" (Janet Jackson song), 1993
 "Again" (Alice in Chains song), 1995
 "Again" (Lenny Kravitz song), 2000
 "Again", by Archive from You All Look the Same to Me, 2002
 "Again", by Kutless from Kutless, 2002
 "Again", by Jennifer Lopez from This Is Me... Then, 2002
 "Again", by Earshot from Two, 2004
 "Again" (Faith Evans song), 2005
 "Again", by Yui Sakakibara, 2006
 "Again" (Yui song), 2008
 "Again" (Flyleaf song), 2009
 "Again" (Jessica Sutta song), 2013
 "Again" (Fetty Wap song), 2015
"Again" (Noah Cyrus Song), 2017
 "Again" (Black Stone Cherry song), 2020
 "Again", by Third Eye Blind from Our Bande Apart, 2021

Other uses 
 "Again", a painting by Thomas Hart Benton (painter)
 Again River, a tributary of Harricana River in Canada
 Again (horse), a racehorse

See also 
 Again and Again (disambiguation)